Matshipi Marcia Letsoalo (born 11 April 1984) is a South African former cricketer who played as a right-arm medium bowler. She appeared in two Test matches, 68 One Day Internationals and 48 Twenty20 Internationals for South Africa between 2007 and 2017. She played domestic cricket for Northerns.

References

External links
 
 

1984 births
Living people
People from Phalaborwa
South African women cricketers
South Africa women Test cricketers
South Africa women One Day International cricketers
South Africa women Twenty20 International cricketers
Northerns women cricketers
Sportspeople from Limpopo